"Aftermath" is a song by American pop vocalist and American Idol season eight runner-up Adam Lambert. The song was written by Lambert, Alisan Porter, Ferras, Ely Rise and produced by Howard Benson for Lambert's debut album, For Your Entertainment. It was released as a charity single on March 10, 2011.

Background
'Aftermath' is a rock-anthem that shows off Lambert’s spectacular range - with his lower register very prominent and his now-familiar riffing on the high notes.

The uplifting message in the lyrics to 'Aftermath' is touching without being sappy. It is, as Lambert has said, a self-empowerment anthem. "And what better song to bring attention to the Trevor Project while also providing encouragement and support to LGBTQ youth and anyone with self-esteem issues[?]"

Critical reception
The album version received mixed reviews. Slant Magazine praised the vocals: "he favorably recalls some of the strongest '80s hair-metal vocalists like Axl Rose and David Coverdale. It's a style that suits Lambert well since it capitalizes on his vocal power and his flair for the dramatic." Allmusic called this song "anonymous" and "anthemic AAA pop." Detroit News disliked this song:"less effective than others (...) kind of "keep pushing on" claptrap every "Idol" album seems to be saddled with." Huffington Post wasn't positive and compared: "perhaps the lone glaringly weak track, hearkening regrettable Idol anthems like "No Boundaries."

However, the remix version was met with positive reviews. Robbie Daw from Idolator said, "We’re digging the dreamy feel of the Billboard remix of "Aftermath," particularly the parts where Adam’s upper range is more prevalent. That said, we love the album version, too, and we really can’t place one above the other." Pat Ryder said, "Maybe it's not perfect, but overall 'Aftermath: Remix' is a good effort by Billboard. Clearly Lambert is happy with the mix and eager to promote it to bring attention to the universal message and to the Trevor Project".

Live performances
The song was performed on Lambert's 2010 Glam Nation Tour during the "ballad" section of the show. Lambert also performed an acoustic rendition of the song on American Idol in 2011.

Track listing
Digital download
 "Aftermath (Billboard Remix)" – 5:24

Personnel
Adam Lambert - songwriter and vocals
Alisan Porter - songwriter
Ferras - songwriter
Ely Rise - songwriter
Howard Benson - producer

Source:

Release history

References

2011 singles
Adam Lambert songs
Songs written by Adam Lambert
2009 songs
Song recordings produced by Howard Benson
RCA Records singles
Jive Records singles
Songs written by Ferras